Martha Patricia Jiménez Oropeza (born 3 April 1964) is a Mexican politician affiliated with the Party of the Democratic Revolution. As of 2014 she served as Senator of the LXI Legislature of the Mexican Congress representing Tabasco as replacement of Rosalinda López Hernández.

References

1964 births
Living people
People from Villahermosa
Women members of the Senate of the Republic (Mexico)
Members of the Senate of the Republic (Mexico)
Party of the Democratic Revolution politicians
Politicians from Tabasco
21st-century Mexican politicians
21st-century Mexican women politicians